Weerasuriya is a Sinhalese surname. Notable people with the surname include:

Lakvin Weerasuriya (born 2000), Sri Lankan cricketer
Thushara Weerasuriya (born 1967), Sri Lankan cricketer

Sinhalese surnames